The political positions of Donald Trump (sometimes referred to as Trumpism), the 45th president of the United States, have frequently
changed. Trump is primarily a populist, protectionist, isolationist, and nationalist.

Political affiliation and ideology

Self-described

Donald Trump registered as a Republican in Manhattan in 1987; since that time, he has changed his party affiliation five times. In 1999, Trump changed his party affiliation to the Independence Party of New York. In August 2001, Trump changed his party affiliation to Democratic. In September 2009, Trump changed his party affiliation back to the Republican Party. In December 2011, Trump changed to "no party affiliation" (independent). In April 2012, Trump again returned to the Republican Party.

In a 2004 interview, Trump told CNN's Wolf Blitzer: "In many cases, I probably identify more as Democrat", explaining: "It just seems that the economy does better under the Democrats than the Republicans. Now, it shouldn't be that way. But if you go back, I mean it just seems that the economy does better under the Democrats...But certainly we had some very good economies under Democrats, as well as Republicans. But we've had some pretty bad disaster under the Republicans." In a July 2015 interview, Trump said that he has a broad range of political positions and that "I identify with some things as a Democrat."

During his 2016 campaign for the presidency, Trump consistently described the state of the United States in bleak terms, referring to it as a nation in dire peril that is plagued by lawlessness, poverty, and violence, constantly under threat, and at risk of having "nothing, absolutely nothing, left". In accepting the Republican nomination for president, Trump said that "I alone can fix" the system, and pledged that if elected, "Americanism, not globalism, will be our credo." He described himself as a "law and order" candidate and "the voice" of "the forgotten men and women". Trump's inaugural address on January 20, 2017, focused on his campaign theme of America in crisis and decline. He pledged to end what he referred to as "American carnage", depicting the United States in a dystopian light—as a "land of abandoned factories, economic angst, rising crime"—while pledging "a new era in American politics".

Although Trump was the Republican nominee, he has signaled that the official party platform, adopted at the 2016 Republican National Convention, diverges from his own views. According to a The Washington Post tally, Trump made some 282 campaign promises over the course of his 2016 campaign.

In February 2017, Trump stated that he was a "total nationalist" in a "true sense". In October 2018, Trump again described himself as a nationalist.

During the last week of his presidential term, Trump was reportedly considering founding a new political party and wanted to call it the Patriot Party.

As described by others

Trump's political positions are viewed by some as populist. Politicians and pundits alike have referred to Trump's populism, anti-free trade, and anti-immigrant stances as "Trumpism".

Liberal economist and columnist Paul Krugman disputes that Trump is a populist, arguing that his policies favor the rich over those less well off. Harvard Kennedy School political scientist Pippa Norris has described Trump as a "populist authoritarian" analogous to European parties such as the Swiss People's Party, Austrian Freedom Party, Swedish Democrats, and Danish People's Party. Columnist Walter Shapiro and political commentator Jonathan Chait describe Trump as authoritarian. Conservative commentator Mary Katharine Ham characterized Trump as a "casual authoritarian," saying "he is a candidate who has happily and proudly spurned the entire idea of limits on his power as an executive and doesn't have any interest in the Constitution and what it allows him to do and what [it] does not allow him to do. That is concerning for people who are interested in limited government." Charles C. W. Cooke of the National Review has expressed similar views, terming Trump an "anti-constitutional authoritarian." Libertarian journalist Nick Gillespie, by contrast, calls Trump "populist rather than an authoritarian". Rich Benjamin refers to Trump and his ideology as fascist and a form of inverted totalitarianism.

Legal experts spanning the political spectrum, including many conservative and libertarian scholars, have suggested that "Trump's blustery attacks on the press, complaints about the judicial system and bold claims of presidential power collectively sketch out a constitutional worldview that shows contempt for the First Amendment, the separation of powers and the rule of law." Law professors Randy E. Barnett, Richard Epstein, and David G. Post, for example, suggest that Trump has little or no awareness of, or commitment to, the constitutional principles of separation of powers and federalism. Law professor Ilya Somin believes that Trump "poses a serious threat to the press and the First Amendment," citing Trump's proposal to expand defamation laws to make it easier to sue journalists and his remark that the owner of The Washington Post, Jeff Bezos, would "have problems" if Trump was elected president. Anthony D. Romero, the executive director of the American Civil Liberties Union, wrote in an op-ed published in The Washington Post in July 2016 that "Trump's proposed policies, if carried out, would trigger a constitutional crisis. By our reckoning, a Trump administration would violate the First, Fourth, Fifth and Eighth amendments if it tried to implement his most controversial plans."

Prior to his election as president, his views on social issues were often described as centrist or moderate. Political commentator Josh Barro termed Trump a "moderate Republican," saying that except on immigration, his views are "anything but ideologically rigid, and he certainly does not equate deal making with surrender." MSNBC host Joe Scarborough said Trump is essentially more like a "centrist Democrat" on social issues. Journalist and political analyst John Heilemann characterized Trump as liberal on social issues, while conservative talk radio host and political commentator Rush Limbaugh said that Heilemann is seeing in Trump what he wants to see. Since he became president, commentators have generally characterized his policy agenda as socially conservative.

Trump and his political views have often been described as nationalist. John Cassidy of the New Yorker writes that Trump seeks to make the Republican Party "into a more populist, nativist, avowedly protectionist, and semi-isolationist party that is skeptical of immigration, free trade, and military interventionism." The Washington Post editorial page editor Fred Hiatt and College of the Holy Cross political scientist Donald Brand describe Trump as a nativist. Rich Lowry, the editor of National Review, instead calls Trump an "immigration hawk" and supports Trump's effort to return immigration levels to what Trump calls a "historically average level". Trump is a protectionist, according to free-market advocate Stephen Moore and conservative economist Larry Kudlow. Historian Joshua M. Zeitz wrote in 2016 that Trump's appeals to "law and order" and "the silent majority" were comparable to the dog-whistle and racially-coded terminology of Richard Nixon.

According to a 2020 study, voters had the most difficulty assessing the ideology of Trump in the 2016 election out of all presidential candidates since 1972 and all contemporary legislators.

Scales and rankings

Crowdpac
In 2015, Crowdpac gave Trump a ranking of 0.4L out of 10, indicating moderate positions. In 2016, the ranking was changed to 5.1C out of 10, shifting him more to the conservative spectrum.

On the issues
The organization and website On the Issues has classified Trump in a variety of ways over time, showing the variance of his political beliefs:
 "Moderate populist" (2003)
 "Liberal-leaning populist" (2003–2011)
 "Moderate populist conservative" (2011–2012)
 "Libertarian-leaning conservative" (2012–2013)
 "Moderate conservative" (2013–2014)
 "Libertarian-leaning conservative" (2014–2015)
 "Hard-core conservative" (2015)
 "Libertarian-leaning conservative" (2015–2016)
 "Moderate conservative" (2016–2017)
 "Hard-core conservative" (2017–present)

Politics and policies during presidency
As president, Trump has pursued sizable income tax cuts, deregulation, increased military spending, rollbacks of federal health-care protections, and the appointment of conservative judges consistent with conservative (Republican Party) policies. However, his anti-globalization policies of trade protectionism cross party lines. In foreign affairs he has described himself as a nationalist. Trump has said that he is "totally flexible on very, very many issues."

Trump's signature issue is immigration, especially illegal immigration, and in particular building or expanding a border wall between the U.S. and Mexico.

In his 2016 presidential campaign, Trump promised significant infrastructure investment and protection for entitlements for the elderly, typically considered liberal (Democratic Party) policies. In October 2016, Trump's campaign posted fourteen categories of policy proposals on his website, which have been since removed. During October 2016, Trump outlined a series of steps for his first 100 days in office.

Trump's political positions, and his descriptions of his beliefs, have often been inconsistent. Politico has described his positions as "eclectic, improvisational and often contradictory." According to an NBC News count, over the course of his campaign Trump made "141 distinct shifts on 23 major issues." Fact-checking organizations reported that during the campaign, Trump made a record number of false statements and lies compared to other candidates, a pattern that has continued — and further increased — in office.

Domestic policy

Campaign finance

While Trump has repeatedly expressed support for "the idea of campaign finance reform," he has not outlined specifics of his actual views on campaign-finance regulation. For example, Trump has not said whether he favors public financing of elections or caps on expenditures of campaigns, outside groups, and individuals.

During the Republican primary race, Trump on several occasions accused his Republican opponents of being bound to their campaign financiers, and asserted that anyone (including Trump himself) could buy their policies with donations. He called super PACs a "scam" and "a horrible thing". In October 2015, he said, "All Presidential candidates should immediately disavow their Super PACs. They're not only breaking the spirit of the law but the law itself."

Having previously touted the self-funding of his campaign as a sign of his independence from the political establishment and big donors, Trump reversed course and started to fundraise in early May 2016. While Trump systematically disavowed pro-Trump super PACs earlier in the race, he stopped doing so from early May 2016.

Civil servants
According to Chris Christie (who served briefly as leader of Trump's White House transition team), Trump will seek to purge the federal government of officials appointed by Obama and will ask Congress to pass legislation making it easier to fire public workers.

Trump's former Chief Strategist, Steve Bannon, stated in February 2017 that Trump's goal is to "deconstruct the administrative state".

Disabled people
Trump has provided "little detail regarding his positions on disability-related policies," and his campaign website made no mention of disabled people. As of June 1, 2016, Trump had not responded to the issue questionnaire of the nonpartisan disability group RespectAbility.

District of Columbia statehood

Donald Trump is opposed to DC statehood.  In 2020, Donald Trump indicated that if the statehood legislation for Washington, D.C. passes both houses of Congress, he would veto the admission legislation.

Education

2016 campaign
Trump has stated his support for school choice and local control for primary and secondary schools. On school choice he's commented, "Our public schools are capable of providing a more competitive product than they do today. Look at some of the high school tests from earlier in this century and you'll wonder if they weren't college-level tests. And we've got to bring on the competition—open the schoolhouse doors and let parents choose the best school for their children. Education reformers call this school choice, charter schools, vouchers, even opportunity scholarships. I call it competition—the American way."

Trump has blasted the Common Core State Standards Initiative, calling it a "total disaster". Trump has asserted that Common Core is "education through Washington, D.C.", a claim which Politifact and other journalists have rated "false", since the adoption and implementation of Common Core is a state choice, not a federal one.

Trump has stated that Ben Carson will be "very much involved in education" under a Trump presidency. Carson rejects the theory of evolution, believes that "home-schoolers do the best, private schoolers next best, charter schoolers next best, and public schoolers worst"; he said that he wanted to "take the federal bureaucracy out of education."

Trump has proposed redirecting $20 billion in existing federal spending to block grants to states to give poor children vouchers to attend a school of their family's choice (including a charter school, private school, or online school). Trump did not explain where the $20 billion in the federal budget would come from. Trump stated that "Distribution of this grant will favor states that have private school choice and charter laws."

Presidency
As president, Trump chose Republican financier Betsy DeVos, a prominent Michigan charter school advocate, as Secretary of Education. The nomination was highly controversial; The Washington Post education writer Valerie Strauss wrote that "DeVos was considered the most controversial education nominee in the history of the nearly 40-year-old Education Department." On the confirmation vote the Senate split 50/50 (along party lines, with two Republican senators joining all Democratic senators to vote against confirmation). Vice President Mike Pence used his tie-breaking vote to confirm the nomination, the first time in U.S. history that this has occurred.

Eminent domain

In 2015 Trump called eminent domain "wonderful". He repeatedly asked the government to invoke it on his behalf during past development projects.

Food safety

In September 2016, Trump posted a list on his web site of regulations that he would eliminate. The list included what it called the "FDA Food Police" and mentioned the Food and Drug Administration's rules governing "farm and food production hygiene" and "food temperatures". The factsheet provided by Trump mirrored a May report by the conservative Heritage Foundation. It was replaced later that month and the new factsheet did not mention the FDA.

Native Americans

Colman McCarthy of The Washington Post wrote in 1993 that in testimony given that year to the House Natural Resources subcommittee on Native American Affairs, Trump "devoted much of his testimony to bad-mouthing Indians and their casinos," asserted that "organized crime is rampant on Indian reservations" and that "if it continues it will be the biggest scandal ever." Trump offered no evidence in support of his claim, and testimony from the FBI's organized crime division, the Justice Department's criminal division, and the IRS's criminal investigation division did not support Trump's assertion. Representative George Miller, a Democrat who was the chairman of the Natural Resources Committee at the time, stated: "In my 19 years in Congress, I've never heard more irresponsible testimony."

Trump bankrolled in 2000 a set of anti-Indian gaming ads in upstate New York that featured "a dark photograph showing hypodermic needles and drug paraphernalia," a warning that "violent criminals were coming to town," and an accusation that the St. Regis Mohawks had a "record of criminal activity." The ad—aimed at stopping the construction of a casino in the Catskills that might hurt Trump's own Atlantic City casinos—was viewed as "incendiary" and racially charged, and at the time local tribal leaders, in response, bought a newspaper ad of their own to denounce the "smear" and "racist and inflammatory rhetoric" of the earlier ad. The ads attracted the attention of the New York Temporary State Commission on Lobbying because they failed to disclose Trump's sponsorship as required by state lobbying rules. Trump acknowledged that he sponsored the ads and reached a settlement with the state in which he and his associates agreed to issue a public apology and pay $250,000 (the largest civil penalty ever levied by the commission) for evading state disclosure rules.

In 2015, Trump defended the controversial team name and mascot of the Washington Redskins, saying that the NFL team should not change its name and he did not find the term to be offensive. The "Change the Mascot" campaign, led by the Oneida Indian Nation and National Congress of American Indians, condemned Trump's stance.

While campaigning in 2016, Trump has repeatedly belittled Democratic Senator Elizabeth Warren of Massachusetts by calling her "Pocahontas" (a reference to Warren's claim, based on family lore, of Native American ancestry, which she has been unable to document). Trump's comments were criticized by a number of public figures as racist and inappropriate. Gyasi Ross of the Blackfeet Nation, a Native American activist and author, criticized Trump's "badgering of Elizabeth Warren as 'Pocahontas'" as "simply the continuation of his pattern of racist bullying."

Questioning Obama's citizenship

For several years Trump promoted "birther" conspiracy theories about Barack Obama's citizenship.

In March 2011, during an interview on Good Morning America, Trump said he was seriously considering running for president, that he was a "little" skeptical of Obama's citizenship and that someone who shares this view should not be so quickly dismissed as an "idiot." Trump added: "Growing up no one knew him"—a claim ranked "Pants on Fire" by Politifact. Later, Trump appeared on The View repeating several times that "I want him (Obama) to show his birth certificate" and speculating that "there's something on that birth certificate that he doesn't like." Although officials in Hawaii certified Obama's citizenship, Trump said in April 2011 he would not let go of the issue, because he was not satisfied that Obama had proved his citizenship.

After Obama released his long-form birth certificate on April 27, 2011, Trump said: "I am really honored and I am really proud, that I was able to do something that nobody else could do." Trump continued to question Obama's birth certificate in the following years, as late as 2015. In May 2012, Trump suggested that Obama might have been born in Kenya. In October 2012, Trump offered to donate five million dollars to the charity of Obama's choice in return for the publication of his college and passport applications before the end of the month. In a 2014 interview, Trump questioned whether Obama had produced his long-form birth certificate. When asked in December 2015 if he still questioned Obama's legitimacy, Trump said that "I don't talk about that anymore."

On September 14, 2016, Trump declined to acknowledge whether he believed Obama was born in the United States. On September 15, 2016, Trump for the first time acknowledged that Obama was born in the United States. He gave a terse statement, saying, "President Barack Obama was born in the United States, period." He falsely accused Hillary Clinton of having started the "Birther" movement. He also asserted that he "finished" the birther controversy, apparently referring to Obama's 2011 release of his long-form birth certificate, despite the fact that he continued to question Obama's citizenship in the years that followed. The next day, Trump tweeted a story in The Washington Post with the headline "Donald Trump's birther event is the greatest trick he's ever pulled". The "greatest trick" of the headline referred to the fact that cable networks aired the event live, waiting for a "birther" statement, while Trump touted his new hotel and supporters gave testimonials. In October 2016, Trump appeared to question the legitimacy of Barack Obama's presidency, referring to him at a rally as the "quote 'president'⁠ ⁠".

Social Security and Medicare

During his campaign Trump repeatedly promised "I’m not going to cut Social Security like every other Republican and I’m not going to cut Medicare or Medicaid." For the first three years of his presidency he said nothing about cutting Social Security or Medicare. In a January 2020 interview he said he planned to "take a look" at entitlement programs like Medicare, but he then said via Twitter "We will not be touching your Social Security or Medicare in Fiscal 2021 Budget." His proposed 2021 budget, unveiled in February 2020, included a $45 billion cut to the program within Social Security that supports disabled people, as well as cuts to Medicare and Medicaid. In August 2020, as part of a package of executive orders related to the COVID-19 pandemic, he signed an order to postpone the collection of the payroll taxes that support Social Security and Medicare, paid by employees and employers, for the rest of 2020. He also said that if he wins re-election, he will forgive the postponed payroll taxes and make permanent cuts to the payroll tax, saying he would "terminate the tax," although only Congress can change tax law. Analysts said such an action would threaten Social Security and Medicare by eliminating the dedicated funding which pays for the programs.

Veterans

2016 presidential campaign 
Trump caused a stir in July 2015 when he charged that Senator John McCain had "done nothing to help the vets," a statement ruled false by PolitiFact and the Chicago Tribune. Trump added that McCain is "not a war hero. He was a war hero because he was captured. I like people who weren't captured."

As a presidential candidate, Trump was critical of the ways in which veterans are treated in the United States, saying "the vets are horribly treated in this country...they are living in hell." He favored eliminating backlogs and wait-lists that had caused a Veterans Health Administration scandal the previous year. He claimed that "over 300,000 veterans have died waiting for care." He said he believed Veterans Affairs (VA) facilities needed to be technologically upgraded, to hire more veterans to treat other veterans, to increase support of female veterans, and to create satellite clinics within hospitals in rural areas. He proposed a plan for reforming the U.S. Department of Veterans Affairs with provisions to allow veterans to obtain care from any doctor or facility that accepts Medicare, to increase funding for PTSD and suicide prevention services, and to provide ob/gyn services at every VA hospital. Trump called for greater privatization of veterans' care, although his plan made no direct reference to letting veterans get health care outside the VA system. The Wall Street Journal noted that "such a plan is counter to recommendations from major veterans groups, the VA itself and from the Commission on Care, an independent body established by Congress that last week made recommendations for VA changes." Trump's plan calls "for legislation making it easier to fire underperforming employees, increasing mental-health resources and adding a White House hotline so veterans can bypass the VA and bring problems directly to the president." Trump opposed the current G.I. Bill.

In January 2016, Trump hosted a fundraising rally for veterans (skipping a televised Republican debate to do so). Weeks later, after the Wall Street Journal inquired with the Trump campaign when veterans' groups would receive their checks, the funds began to be disbursed. In April, the Journal reported that the funds had yet to be fully distributed. In May, NPR confirmed directly with 30 recipient charities that they had received their funds, "accounting for $4.27 million of the $5.6 million total," while the remaining 11 charities did not answer the question.

Presidency and 2020 campaign 
In February 2018, the Trump administration initiated a policy known as ‘Deploy Or Get Out’ (DOGO), ordering the Pentagon to discharge any soldier who would be ineligible for deployment within the next 12 months. This mainly affected disabled soldiers. It also affected HIV-positive soldiers, who are allowed to serve within the US but cannot be deployed overseas; the DOGO policy meant that they could no longer serve within the US, either.

In August 2019, Trump credited himself for the passing the Veterans Choice Act, a law that had actually been passed under the previous president, Barack Obama, in 2014. Trump did sign an expansion of that act in 2018.

In September 2020, The Atlantic reported that Trump referred to Americans who were casualties of war as "losers" and "suckers", citing multiple people who were present for the statements; later reporting by the Associated Press and Fox News corroborated some of these stories. Veterans expressed scorn over the report's allegations. Trump denied these allegations and called them "disgraceful", adding: "I would be willing to swear on anything that I never said that about our fallen heroes". John Bolton, who was present at the discussion, also said he never heard Trump make such comments.

Economy and trade

Environment and energy

By March 2016, Trump had not released any plans to combat climate change or provided details regarding his approach to energy issues more broadly.

In May 2016, Trump asked U.S. Representative Kevin Cramer, Republican of North Dakota—described by Reuters as "one of America's most ardent drilling advocates and climate change skeptics"—to draft Trump's energy policy.

California drought

In May 2016, Trump said that he could solve the water crisis in California. He declared that "there is no drought," a statement which the Associated Press noted is incorrect. Trump accused California state officials of denying farmers of water so they can send it out to sea "to protect a certain kind of three-inch fish." According to the AP, Trump appeared to be referring to a dispute between Central Valley farming interests and environmental interests; California farmers accuse water authorities of short-changing them of the water in their efforts to protect endangered native fish species.

Climate change and pollution

Trump rejects the scientific consensus on climate change, repeatedly contending that global warming is a "hoax." He has said that "the concept of global warming was created by and for the Chinese in order to make U.S. manufacturing non-competitive," a statement which Trump later said was a joke. However, it was also pointed out that he often conflates weather with climate change.

Trump criticized President Obama's description of climate change as "the greatest threat to future generations" for being "naive" and "one of the dumbest statements I've ever heard." A 2016 report by the Sierra Club contended that, were he to be elected president, Trump would be the only head of state in the world to contend that climate change is a hoax. In December 2009, Trump and his three adult children had signed a full-page advertisement from "business leaders" in The New York Times stating "If we fail to act now, it is scientifically irrefutable that there will be catastrophic and irreversible consequences for humanity and our planet" and encouraging "investment in the clean energy economy" to "create new energy jobs and increase our energy security".

Although "not a believer in climate change," Trump has stated that "clean air is a pressing problem" and has said: "There is still much that needs to be investigated in the field of climate change. Perhaps the best use of our limited financial resources should be in dealing with making sure that every person in the world has clean water."

In May 2016, during his presidential campaign, Trump issued an energy plan focused on promoting fossil fuels and weakening environmental regulation. Trump promised to "rescind" in his first 100 days in office a variety of Environmental Protection Agency regulations established during the Obama administration to limit carbon emissions from coal-fired power plants, which contribute to a warming global climate. Trump has specifically pledged to revoke the Climate Action Plan and the Waters of the United States rule, which he characterizes as two "job-destroying Obama executive actions."

Trump has said "we're practically not allowed to use coal any more," a statement rated "mostly false" by PolitiFact. Trump has criticized the Obama administration's coal policies, describing the administration's moves to phase out the use of coal-fired power plants as "stupid." Trump has criticized the Obama administration for prohibiting "coal production on federal land" and states that it seeks to adopt "draconian climate rules that, unless stopped, would effectively bypass Congress to impose job-killing cap-and-trade." Trump has vowed to revive the U.S. coal economy, a pledge that is viewed by experts as unlikely to be fulfilled because the decline of the coal industry is driven by market forces, and specifically by the U.S. natural gas boom. An analysis by Scientific American found that Trump's promise to bring back closed coal mines would be difficult to fulfill, both because of environmental regulations and economic shifts. An analysis by Bloomberg New Energy Finance dismissed Trump's claims of a "war on coal": "U.S. coal's main problem has been cheap natural gas and renewable power, not a politically driven 'war on coal'...[coal] will continue being pushed out of the generating mix."

Trump wrote in his 2011 book that he opposed a cap-and-trade system to control carbon emissions.

According to FactCheck.org, over at least a five-year period, Trump has on several occasions made incorrect claims about the use of hair spray and its role in ozone depletion. At a rally in May 2016, "Trump implied that the regulations on hairspray and coal mining are both unwarranted" and incorrectly asserted that hairspray use in a "sealed" apartment prevents the spray's ozone-depleting substances from reaching the atmosphere.

In June 2019, the Trump White House tried to prevent a State Department intelligence analyst from testifying to Congress about "possibly catastrophic" effects of human-caused climate change, and prevented his written testimony containing science from NASA and NOAA from being included in the official Congressional Record because it was not consistent with administration positions.

In August 2019, Trump described America's coal production as "clean, beautiful", despite coal being a particularly polluting energy source. Although "clean coal" is a specific jargon used by the coal industry for certain technologies, Trump instead generally describes that coal itself is "clean".

Opposition to international cooperation on climate change

Trump pledged in his May 2016 speech on energy policy to "cancel the Paris climate agreement" adopted at the 2015 United Nations Climate Change Conference (in which 170 countries committed to reductions in carbon emissions). Trump pledged to cancel the agreement in his first hundred days in office. This pledge followed earlier comments by Trump, in which he said that as president, he would "at a minimum" seek to renegotiate the agreement and "at a maximum I may do something else." Trump characterizes the Paris Agreement "one-sided" and "bad for the United States," believing that the agreement is too favorable to China and other countries. In his May 2016 speech, Trump inaccurately said that the Paris Agreement "gives foreign bureaucrats control over how much energy we use on our land, in our country"; in fact, the Paris Agreement is based on voluntary government pledges, and no country controls the emissions-reduction plan of any other country.

Once the agreement is ratified by 55 nations representing 55 percent of global emissions (which has not yet occurred), a four-year waiting period goes into effect for any country wishing to withdraw from the agreement. A U.S. move to withdraw from the Paris Agreement as Trump proposes is viewed as likely to unravel the agreement; according to Reuters, such a move would spell "potential doom for an agreement many view as a last chance to turn the tide on global warming."

In Trump's May 2016 speech on energy policy, he declared that if elected president, he would "stop all payment of U.S. tax dollars to global warming programs." This would be a reversal of the U.S. pledge to commit funds to developing countries to assist in climate change mitigation and could undermine the willingness of other countries to take action against climate change.

In August 2016, 375 members of the U.S. National Academy of Sciences, including 30 Nobel laureates, issued an open letter warning that Trump's plan to unilaterally withdraw from the Paris Agreement would have dire effects on the fight against climate change. The scientists wrote, in part:

Energy independence

In his May 2016 speech on energy policy, Trump stated : "Under my presidency, we will accomplish complete American energy independence. We will become totally independent of the need to import energy from the oil cartel or any nation hostile to our interest." The New York Times reported that "experts say that such remarks display a basic ignorance of the workings of the global oil markets."

Environmental regulation
In January 2016, Trump vowed "tremendous cutting" of the budget for the U.S. Environmental Protection Agency if elected. In an October 2015 interview with Chris Wallace, Trump explained, "what they do is a disgrace. Every week they come out with new regulations." When Wallace asked, "Who's going to protect the environment?", Trump answered "we'll be fine with the environment. We can leave a little bit, but you can't destroy businesses."

Trump has charged that the "U.S. Fish and Wildlife Service abuses the Endangered Species Act to restrict oil and gas exploration." In 2011, Trump said that would permit drilling in the Arctic National Wildlife Refuge in northeastern Alaska.

In July 2016, Trump suggested that he was in favor of state and local bans on hydraulic fracturing (fracking), saying, "I'm in favor of fracking, but I think that voters should have a big say in it. I mean, there's some areas, maybe, they don't want to have fracking. And I think if the voters are voting for it, that's up to them...if a municipality or a state wants to ban fracking, I can understand that."

Pipelines

Keystone XL

Trump promised to construct the Keystone XL pipeline, a proposed project to bring Canadian petroleum to the U.S. Trump pledged that if elected, he would ask TransCanada Corp. to renew its permit application for the project within his first hundred days in office. Trump claimed that Keystone XL pipeline will have "no impact on environment" and create "lots of jobs for U.S.," although in fact the pipeline is projected to create only 35 permanent jobs.

In his first days in office, Trump revived the Keystone XL project, signing a presidential memorandum reversing the rejection of the proposed pipeline that President Obama had made. Trump "also signed a directive ordering an end to protracted environmental reviews," pledging to make environmental review " a very short process."

Dakota Access Pipeline

After months of protest by thousands of protesters, including the largest gathering of Native Americans in 100 years, in December 2016 the United States Army Corps of Engineers under the Obama administration announced that it would not grant an easement for the pipeline, and the Corps of Engineers undertook an environmental impact statement to look at possible alternative routes.
However, in February 2017, newly elected President Donald Trump ended the environmental impact assessment and ordered for construction to continue. Trump has financial ties to Energy Transfer Partners and Phillips 66, who are both directly involved in the controversial project. The CEO of Energy Transfer Partners is a campaign donor for Donald Trump.

Renewable energy

In his 2015 book Crippled America, Trump is highly critical of the "big push" to develop renewable energy, arguing that the push is based on a mistaken belief that greenhouse gases contribute to climate change. He writes, "There has been a big push to develop alternative forms of energy—so-called green energy—from renewable sources. That's a big mistake. To begin with, the whole push for renewable energy is being driven by the wrong motivation, the mistaken belief that global climate change is being caused by carbon emissions. If you don't buy that—and I don't—then what we have is really just an expensive way of making the tree-huggers feel good about themselves."

Despite criticizing wind farms in the past (calling them "ugly"), Trump has said that he does not oppose the wind production tax credit, saying: "I'm okay with subsidies, to an extent." Trump has criticized wind energy for being expensive and for not working without "massive subsidies". He added, "windmills are killing hundreds and hundreds of eagles. One of the most beautiful, one of the most treasured birds—and they're killing them by the hundreds and nothing happens," a claim rated as "mostly false" by PolitiFact since best estimates indicate that about one hundred golden eagles are killed each year by wind turbine blades.

In his official platform, Trump claims that he will reduce bureaucracy which would then lead to greater innovation. His platform mentions "renewable energies", including "nuclear, wind and solar energy" in that regard but adds that he would not support those "to the exclusion of other energy".

Trump supports a higher ethanol mandate (the amount of ethanol required by federal regulation to be blended into the U.S. gasoline supply). Trump vowed to protect the government's Renewable Fuel Standard and the corn-based ethanol.

In August 2019, Trump falsely claimed: "if a windmill is within two miles of your house, your house is practically worthless"; this claim is not supported by studies in the United States.

Wildlife conservation and animal welfare
In October 2016, the Humane Society denounced Trump's campaign, saying that a "Trump presidency would be a threat to animals everywhere" and that he has "a team of advisors and financial supporters tied in with trophy hunting, puppy mills, factory farming, horse slaughter, and other abusive industries."

In February 2017, under the Trump administration, the U.S. Department of Agriculture (USDA) unexpectedly removed from its public website "all enforcement records related to horse soring and to animal welfare at dog breeding operations and other facilities." The decision prompted criticism from animal welfare advocates (such as the Animal Welfare Institute), investigative journalists, and some of the regulated industries (the Association of Zoos and Aquariums and the group Speaking of Research said that the move created an impression of non-transparency).

Foreign policy and defense

Health care

Actions while in office

Legislation

President Trump advocated repealing and replacing the Affordable Care Act (ACA or "Obamacare"). The Republican-controlled House passed the American Health Care Act (AHCA) in May 2017, handing it to the Senate, which decided to write its own version of the bill rather than voting on the AHCA. The Senate bill, called the "Better Care Reconciliation Act of 2017" (BCRA), failed on a vote of 45–55 in the Senate during July 2017. Other variations also failed to gather the required support, facing unanimous Democratic Party opposition and some Republican opposition. The Congressional Budget Office estimated that the bills would increase the number of uninsured by over 20 million persons, while reducing the budget deficit marginally.

Actions to hinder implementation of ACA

President Trump continued Republican attacks on the ACA while in office, including steps such as:
 Weakening the individual mandate through his first executive order, which resulted in limiting enforcement of mandate penalties by the IRS. For example, tax returns without indications of health insurance ("silent returns") will still be processed, overriding instructions from the Obama administration to the IRS to reject them.
 Reducing funding for advertising for the 2017 and 2018 exchange enrollment periods by up to 90%, with other reductions to support resources used to answer questions and help people sign-up for coverage. This action could reduce ACA enrollment.
 Cutting the enrollment period for 2018 by half, to 45 days. The NYT editorial board referred to this as part of a concerted "sabotage" effort.
 Issuing public statements that the exchanges are unstable or in a death spiral. CBO reported in May 2017 that the exchanges would remain stable under current law (ACA), but would be less stable if the AHCA were passed.

Several insurers and actuary groups cited uncertainty created by President Trump, specifically non-enforcement of the individual mandate and not funding cost sharing reduction subsidies, as contributing 20-30 percentage points to premium increases for the 2018 plan year on the ACA exchanges. In other words, absent Trump's actions against the ACA, premium increases would have averaged 10% or less, rather than the estimated 28-40% under the uncertainty his actions created. The Center on Budget and Policy Priorities (CBPP) maintains a timeline of many "sabotage" efforts by the Trump Administration.

Ending cost-sharing reduction (CSR) payments

President Trump announced in October 2017 he would end the smaller of the two types of subsidies under the ACA, the cost sharing reduction (CSR) subsidies. This controversial decision significantly raised premiums on the ACA exchanges (as much as 20 percentage points) along with the premium tax credit subsidies that rise with them, with the CBO estimating a $200 billion increase in the budget deficit over a decade. CBO also estimated that initially up to one million fewer would have health insurance coverage, although more might have it in the long-run as the subsidies expand. CBO expected the exchanges to remain stable (e.g., no "death spiral") as the premiums would increase and prices would stabilize at the higher (non-CSR) level.

President Trump's argument that the CSR payments were a "bailout" for insurance companies and therefore should be stopped, actually results in the government paying more to insurance companies ($200B over a decade) due to increases in the premium tax credit subsidies. Journalist Sarah Kliff therefore described Trump's argument as "completely incoherent."

2020 campaign

In August 2019, at a campaign rally, Trump claimed that his administration "will always protect patients with pre-existing conditions, always." However, his administration had already repeatedly attempted to water down or repeal the ACA's protections for people with preexisting medical conditions, without any proposal on how to restore these protections if the ACA is rendered void.

Prior to election

According to a report by the RAND Corporation, Trump's proposed health-care policy proposals, depending on specific elements implemented, would result in between 15 and 25 million fewer people with health insurance and increase the federal deficit in a range from zero to $41 billion in 2018. This was in contrast to Clinton's proposals, which would expand health insurance coverage for between zero and 10 million people while increasing the deficit in a range from zero to $90 billion in 2018. According to the report, low-income individuals and sicker people would be most adversely affected by his proposed policies, although it was pointed out that not all policy proposals have been modeled.

Affordable Care Act and health-care reform

As the 2016 campaign unfolded, Trump stated that he favors repealing the Affordable Care Act (ACA or "Obamacare")—which Trump refers to as a "complete disaster"—and replacing it with a "free-market system." On his campaign website, Trump says, "on day one of the Trump Administration, we will ask Congress to immediately deliver a full repeal of Obamacare." Trump's campaign has insisted that the candidate has "never supported socialized medicine."

Trump has cited the rising costs of premiums and deductibles as a motivation to repeal the Affordable Care Act. However, according to a study by the Kaiser Family Foundation, the after-subsidy premium costs to those with insurance coverage via the Affordable Care Act's exchanges did not change significantly on average from 2016 to 2017, as increases in the subsidies offset pre-subsidy insurance premium increases. For example, after-subsidy costs for a popular "silver plan" remained around $200/month in 2016 and 2017. An estimated 70% of persons on the exchanges could purchase a plan for $75/month after subsidies. Further, in the employer market, health insurance premium cost increases from 2015 to 2016 were an estimated 3% on average, low by historical standards. While deductibles rose 12% on average from 2015 to 2016, more workers are pairing higher-deductible plans with tax-preferred health savings accounts (HSAs), offsetting some of the deductible increase (i.e., lowering their effective deductible).

The Congressional Budget Office reported in March 2016 that there were approximately 23 million people with insurance due to the law, with 12 million people covered by the exchanges (10 million of whom received subsidies to help pay for insurance) and 11 million made eligible for Medicaid. The CBO also reported in June 2015 that: "Including the budgetary effects of macroeconomic feedback, repealing the ACA would increase federal budget deficits by $137 billion over the 2016–2025 period." CBO also estimated that excluding the effects of macroeconomic feedback, repeal of the ACA would increase the deficit by $353 billion over that same period.

In the early part of his campaign, Trump responded to questions about his plan to replace the ACA by saying that it would be "something terrific!" Trump subsequently said at various points that he believes that the government should have limited involvement of health care, but has also said that "at the lower end, where people have no money, I want to try and help those people," by "work[ing] out some sort of a really smart deal with hospitals across the country." and has said "everybody's got to be covered." At a February 2016 town hall on CNN, Trump said that he supported the individual health insurance mandate of the ACA, which requires all Americans to have health insurance, saying "I like the mandate. So here's where I'm a little bit different [from other Republican candidates]." In March 2016, Trump reversed himself, saying that "Our elected representatives must eliminate the individual mandate. No person should be required to buy insurance unless he or she wants to."

In March 2016, Trump released his health care plan, which called for allowing health-insurance companies to compete across state lines and for making Medicaid into a block grant system for the states. He also called for elimination of the individual mandate for health insurance, for allowing health insurance premiums to be deducted on tax returns, and for international competition in the drug market. In the same document, Trump acknowledged that mental health care in the U.S. is often inadequate but offered no immediate solution to the problem, instead stating that "there are promising reforms being developed in Congress." Trump also emphasized the removal of market entry barriers for drug providers and improved access to imported medication corresponding to safety standards.

Explaining how he would address the problem of ensuring the people that would lose their insurance coverage if Obamacare were repealed, Trump said, "We have to come up, and we can come up with many different plans. In fact, plans you don't even know about will be devised because we're going to come up with plans—health care plans—that will be so good. And so much less expensive both for the country and for the people. And so much better." His plan has been criticized by Republican health experts as "a jumbled hodgepodge of old Republican ideas, randomly selected, that don't fit together" (Robert Laszewski) providing nothing that "would do anything more than cover a couple million people," (Gail R. Wilensky).

In 1999, during his abortive 2000 Reform Party presidential campaign, Trump told TV interviewer Larry King, "I believe in universal health care." In his 2000 book, The America We Deserve, Trump reiterated his call for universal health care and focused on a Canadian-style single-payer health care system as a means to achieve it. Though he characterized the Canadian health-care system as "catastrophic in certain ways" in October 2016 during the second presidential debate, the Trump campaign website wrote in June 2015 about his support for "a system that would mirror Canada's government-run healthcare service" under the title "What does Donald Trump believe? Where the candidate stands on 10 issues". In 2015, Trump also expressed admiration for the Scottish health-care system, which is single payer.

Public health

Ebola

In 2014, after a New York physician returned from treating Ebola patients in West Africa and showed symptoms of the disease, Trump tweeted that if the doctor had Ebola, "Obama should apologize to the American people & resign!" When the doctor was later confirmed to have developed Ebola in New York, Trump tweeted that it was "Obama's fault" and "I have been saying for weeks for President Obama to stop the flights from West Africa. So simple, but he refused. A TOTAL incompetent!" Trump also criticized President Obama's decision to send 3,000 U.S. troops to affected regions to help combat the outbreak (see Operation United Assistance).

As Dr. Kent Brantly returned to the U.S. for treatment, Trump tweeted that U.S. doctors who went abroad to treat Ebola were "great" but "must suffer the consequences" if they became infected and insisted that "the U.S. must immediately stop all flights from EBOLA infected countries or the plague will start and spread inside our 'borders.'" When an Ebola patient was scheduled to come to the U.S. for treatment, Trump tweeted, "now I know for sure that our leaders are incompetent. KEEP THEM OUT OF HERE!"

Trump's suggestion on the Ebola crisis "would go against all the expert advice being offered," with doctors warning "that isolating West Africa would only make the Ebola outbreak much worse, potentially denying help and supplies from getting in," and possibly destabilizing the countries and contributing to the disease's spread outside West Africa.

Zika

On August 3, 2016, Trump called the Zika virus outbreak in Florida "a big problem". He expressed his support for Florida Governor Rick Scott's handling of the crisis, saying that he's "doing a fantastic job". When asked if Congress should convene an emergency session to approve Zika funding, Trump answered, "I would say that it's up to Rick Scott." On August 11, 2016, Trump said that he was in favor of Congress setting aside money to combat the Zika virus.

Vaccines
Trump believed that childhood vaccinations were related to autism, a hypothesis which has been repeatedly debunked. The American Academy of Pediatrics and Autism Speaks have "decried Trump's remarks as false and potentially dangerous."

In 2010, the Donald J. Trump Foundation donated $10,000 to Generation Rescue, Jenny McCarthy's nonprofit organization that advocates the incorrect view that autism and related disorders are primarily caused by vaccines.

Despite his prior views, however, Trump did drop his claims of vaccines being related to autism in 2019 after the 2019 measles outbreaks, in saying: "They have to get those shots," as well as "...vaccinations are so important".

Immigration

Illegal immigration was a signature issue of Trump's presidential campaign, and his proposed reforms and controversial remarks regarding immigration have also expressed support for a variety of "limits on legal immigration and guest-worker visas," including a "pause" on granting green cards, which Trump says will "allow record immigration levels to subside to more moderate historical averages."

In August 2019, Trump accused Democrats of supporting "open borders" by attempting to use their opposition to his immigration priorities as an example despite no explicit evidence to support his claim. He also claimed that his administration is "building the wall faster and better than ever", but no new barriers were erected by June 2019 at the Mexico–United States border unlike what Trump promised during his 2016 campaign. The only installations have been replacement fencing of old barriers. Trump also falsely claimed that only 2% of migrants who were released instead of detained eventually returned for their immigration hearings. The 2017 statistic is 72% for migrants, and 89% of migrants applying for asylum.

Law and order

Capital punishment

Trump has long advocated for capital punishment in the United States. In May 1989, shortly after the Central Park jogger case received widespread media attention, Trump purchased a full-page ad in four New York City newspapers with the title "BRING BACK THE DEATH PENALTY!" Five defendants (the "Central Park Five") were wrongfully convicted in the case and were subsequently exonerated. By October 2016, Trump still maintained that the "Central Park Five" were guilty.

In December 2015, in a speech accepting the endorsement of the New England Police Benevolent Association, Trump said that "One of the first things I do [if elected President] in terms of executive order if I win will be to sign a strong, strong statement that will go out to the country, out to the world, that...anybody killing a police officer—death penalty. It's going to happen, O.K.?" However, the president has no authority over these prosecutions as they usually take place in state court under state law, and over one-third of U.S. states have already abolished the death penalty. Furthermore, mandatory death sentences are unconstitutional, as held by the Supreme Court in Woodson v. North Carolina (1976).

Torture

Trump has said that he believes that "torture absolutely works". During his campaign, Trump said that "I would bring back waterboarding, and I'd bring back a hell of a lot worse than waterboarding". However, during his presidency, he did not bring back waterboarding.

Criminal justice

As of May 2016, Trump's campaign website makes no mention of criminal justice reform, and Trump rarely talks specifics. Trump has stated that he would be "tough on crime" and criticized Barack Obama's and Hillary Clinton's criminal justice reform proposals. When asked about specific criminal justice reforms, Trump reportedly often changes the subject back to supporting police or vague answers about needing to be "tough." In January 2016, Trump said that along with veterans, "the most mistreated people in this country are police."

Trump supports the use of "stop and frisk" tactics, of the kind once used in New York City. In 2000, Trump also rejected as elitist and naive the arguments of criminal justice reformers that the U.S. criminal justice system puts too many criminals in jail. Trump is in favor of at least one mandatory sentence, where using a gun to commit a crime results in a five-year sentence.

Trump has on several occasions asserted that crime is rising in the United States. Trump's assertion that crime is rising is false; in fact, both violent crime and property declined consistently declining in the U.S. from the early 1990s until 2014. Trump's claim that "inner-city crime is reaching record levels" received a "pants-on-fire" rating from PolitiFact. As President, Trump reiterated in February 2017 the false claim that crime was rising, saying, "the murder rate in our country is the highest it's been in 47 years."

In May 2016, Trump stated that the cities of Oakland and Ferguson are "among the most dangerous in the world". In response, CBS News in San Francisco reported that the murder rates in Oakland and Baghdad are comparable, but PolitiFact rated Trump's claim false given that "homicide rates alone are not enough to gauge whether a city is dangerous or not".

On November 22, 2015, Trump retweeted a graphic with purported statistics—cited to a nonexistent "Crime Statistics Bureau"—which claimed that African Americans were responsible for 81% of the homicides of White Americans and that police were responsible for 1% of black homicides compared to 4% of white homicides. Trump's retweet earned PolitiFact's "Pants on Fire" rating and was called "grossly inaccurate" by FactCheck.org the next day. Blacks were actually responsible for only 15% of white homicides according to FBI data for 2014. The breakdown of the racial differences in police killings in Trump's retweet was also inaccurate. Based on the percentages, the number of whites killed by police would be almost 4 times greater than the number of blacks. Data from The Washington Post for 2009 to 2013 showed a ratio of 1.5 white deaths by police for each black death. A separate estimate by Peter Moskos, associate professor at the John Jay College of Criminal Justice attributed 10% of white homicides to police and 4% to police for blacks. When asked about the statistics, Trump maintained that the statistics came "from sources that are very credible."

Drug policy

Trump's views on drug policy have shifted dramatically over time.

At a luncheon hosted by the Miami Herald in April 1990, Trump told a crowd of 700 people that U.S. drug enforcement policy was "a joke," and that: "We're losing badly the war on drugs. You have to legalize drugs to win that war. You have to take the profit away from these drug czars."

In his campaign for the presidency in 2015 and 2016, however, Trump adopted "drug warrior" positions and has sought advice on the issue from William J. Bennett, who served as the U.S. first "drug czar" in the 1980s "and has remained a proponent of harsh 1980s-style drug war tactics." Trump told Sean Hannity in June 2015 that he opposes marijuana legalization and that "I feel strongly about that." Trump also claims to have personally never used controlled substances of any kind.

Trump has voiced support for medical marijuana, saying that he is "a hundred percent in favor" because "I know people that have serious problems...and...it really, really does help them." When asked about Colorado (where recreational use of marijuana is legal), Trump softened his previously expressed views and essentially said that states should be able to decide on whether marijuana for recreational purposes should be legal.

The administration organized the Marijuana Policy Coordination Committee in 2018.

Gun regulation

In his 2000 book The America We Deserve, Trump wrote that he generally opposed gun control, but supported the Federal Assault Weapons Ban and supported a "slightly longer waiting period to purchase a gun." In his book, Trump also criticized the gun lobby, saying: "The Republicans walk the N.R.A. line and refuse even limited restrictions." In 2008, Trump opposed hunting-education classes in schools and called the "thought of voluntarily putting guns in the classroom...a really bad plan."

While campaigning for the presidency Trump reversed some of his positions on gun issues, calling for the expansion of gun rights. In 2015 he described himself as a staunch advocate of the Second Amendment and said concealed carry "is a right, not a privilege." He proposed eliminating prohibitions on assault weapons, military-style weapons and high-capacity magazines (which Trump described as "scary sounding phrases" used by gun control advocates "to confuse people"), as well as making concealed carry permits valid nationwide, rather than on the current state-to-state basis. At his campaign website he called for an overhaul of the current federal background check system, arguing that "Too many states are failing to put criminal and mental health records into the system."

On the campaign trail in 2015, Trump praised the National Rifle Association (NRA), and received the group's endorsement after becoming the presumptive Republican nominee. He asserted that the presence of more guns in schools and public places could have stopped mass shootings such as those in Paris, San Bernardino, California, and Umpqua Community College. Trump supported barring people on the government's terrorist watch list from purchasing weapons, saying in 2015: "If somebody is on a watch list and an enemy of state and we know it's an enemy of state, I would keep them away, absolutely." This is one position where Trump departs from the position of gun-rights groups and most of his Republican rivals for the presidency and supports a stance backed by Senate Democrats. Trump said that he holds a New York concealed carry permit and that "I carry on occasion, sometimes a lot. I like to be unpredictable." A 1987 Associated Press story said that he held a handgun permit at that time.

In January 2016, Trump said: "I will get rid of gun-free zones on schools, and—you have to—and on military bases...My first day, it gets signed, okay? My first day. There's no more gun-free zones." Trump could not eliminate gun-free school zones by executive order, however, since such zones were created by a federal law that can only be reversed by Congress. In May 2016, Trump made ambiguous comments on guns in classrooms, saying: "I don't want to have guns in classrooms. Although, in some cases, teachers should have guns in classrooms." In May 2016, Trump accused Hillary Clinton of lying when she claimed that "Donald Trump would force schools to allow guns in classrooms on his first day in office." According to The Washington Post fact-checker, Clinton's statement was accurate.

In June 2016, Trump said "it would have been a beautiful, beautiful sight" to see Omar Mateen shot in the head by an armed patron in the Orlando nightclub shooting, reiterating his stance that more people should be armed in public places. A few days later, after two top officials of the NRA challenged the notion that drinking clubgoers should be armed, Trump reversed his position, saying that he "obviously" meant that additional guards or employees should have been armed in the nightclub. Security personnel and other staffers at a number of Trump's hotels and golf courses told ABC News that patrons are not permitted to carry guns on the property. A Trump spokesman denied this, saying that licensed persons are permitted to carry guns on the premises.

At a rally on August 9, 2016, Trump accused his opponent of wanting to "essentially abolish the Second Amendment", and went on: "By the way, and if she gets to pick her judges, nothing you can do, folks. Although the Second Amendment people, maybe there is, I don't know." These comments were interpreted by critics as suggesting violence against Clinton or her appointees, but Trump's campaign stated that he was referring to gun rights advocates' "great political power" as a voting bloc.

One month after his inauguration, Trump reversed an Obama-era regulation that had been intended to prevent weapons purchases by certain people with mental health problems. Had the regulation been allowed to take effect, it would have added 75,000 names, including the names of those whose receive federal financial assistance due to a mental illness or who have financial proxies due to a mental illness, to a background check database.

Following the Stoneman Douglas High School shooting in February 2018, Trump met with students and others at the White House for a "listening session." Trump suggested arming up to 20% of the teachers to stop "maniacs" from attacking students. The following day Trump called a "gun free" school a "magnet" for criminals and tweeted, "Highly trained, gun adept, teachers/coaches would solve the problem instantly, before police arrive. GREAT DETERRENT!"

In August 2019, following mass shootings in El Paso, Texas and Dayton, Ohio, Trump declined to support universal background checks, saying that existing background checks are already "very, very strong," even though "we have sort of missing areas and areas that don’t complete the whole circle.” He also indicated that he was not interested in working on bipartisan compromises.

Judiciary

According to The New York Times, many of Trump's statements on legal topics are "extemporaneous and resist conventional legal analysis," with some appearing "to betray ignorance of fundamental legal concepts."

Supreme Court

Trump has stated that he wants to replace Antonin Scalia on the U.S. Supreme Court with "a person of similar views and principles". He has released a list of eleven potential picks to replace Scalia. The jurists are widely considered to be conservative. All are white, and eight of the eleven are men. The list includes five out of the eight individuals recommended by the Heritage Foundation, a conservative think tank. Trump had previously insisted that he would seek guidance from conservative groups such as the Federalist Society and the Heritage Foundation when it came to picking Supreme Court candidates. Several of the judges listed by Trump have questioned abortion rights. Six of the eleven judges have clerked for conservative Supreme Court justices.

Trump has claimed that he "would probably appoint" justices to the Supreme Court who "would look very seriously" at the Hillary Clinton email controversy "because it's a criminal activity." However, under the U.S. Constitution, Supreme Court justices "are neither investigators nor prosecutors."

Trump has criticized Chief Justice of the United States John Roberts, a George W. Bush appointee, as a "nightmare for conservatives," citing Roberts' vote in the 2015 decision in King v. Burwell, which upheld provisions of the Affordable Care Act. He has also blamed Roberts for the June 2015 Supreme Court ruling legalizing same-sex marriage, apparently in error, since in that case Roberts actually dissented from the majority opinion.

In February 2016, Trump called on the Senate to stop Obama from filling the vacant seat on the Supreme Court.

An analysis by FiveThirtyEight shows that, under the assumption that Scalia's vacant seat on the Court will not be filled, and taking account of the advanced age of three of the sitting justices, that a Trump presidency would move the Supreme Court "rightward toward its most conservative position in recent memory".

Comments on judges and judicial decisions
Since taking office, Trump has made a series of "escalating attacks on the federal judiciary" in response to judicial decisions against him. After a federal district judge issued a stay of Trump's executive order on travel, immigration, and refugees, Trump disparaged the judge on Twitter, referring to him as a "the so-called judge" and writing: "[He] put our country in such peril. If something happens blame him and court system. People pouring in. Bad!"

While presidents in the past have sometimes offered muted criticism of judicial opinions, Trump's personal attacks on individual judges are seen as unprecedented in American history. Trump's remarks prompted criticism from his own Supreme Court nominee, Judge Neil Gorsuch, who told Senator Richard Blumenthal that Trump's statements were "disheartening" and "demoralizing" to the federal judiciary. A number of legal scholars feared that Trump's conduct could undermine public confidence in the courts and endanger the independence of the judiciary.

Term limits and ethics regulations

In October 2016, Trump said that he would push for a constitutional amendment to impose term limits on members of Congress, so that members of the House of Representatives could serve for a maximum of six years and Senators for a maximum of twelve years. Trump also pledged to re-institute a ban on executive branch officials from lobbying for five years after leaving government service and said that he supported Congress instituting a similar five-year lobbying ban of its own, applicable to former members and staff. Under current "cooling-off period" regulations, former U.S. Representatives are required to wait one year before they can lobby Congress, former U.S. Senators are required to two years, and former executive-branch officials "must wait either two years or one year before lobbying their former agency, depending on how senior they were."

Twenty-second Amendment
On multiple occasions since taking office in 2017, Trump has questioned presidential term limits and in public remarks has talked about serving beyond the limits of the 22nd Amendment. For instance, during an April 2019 White House event for the Wounded Warrior Project, he joked that he would remain president "at least for 10 or 14 years".

Flag desecration
During a rally in June 2020, President Trump told supporters that he thinks flag burning should be punishable by one year in prison.

Official language
In 2015 during a debate, Trump said, "This is a country where we speak English, not Spanish."

In June 2019, Senator Steve Daines (R-MT) proposed reviving the previously unsuccessful language amendment, and in doing so received the support of the Trump administration.

Video game violence

Trump has voiced his opposition to video game violence. After it was erroneously reported that the Sandy Hook shooter frequently played violent video games, Trump tweeted, "Video game violence & glorification must be stopped—it is creating monsters!"

After the 2019 El Paso shooting, Trump said in a speech, "We must stop the glorification of violence in our society. This includes the gruesome and grisly video games that are now commonplace. It is too easy today for troubled youth to surround themselves with a culture that celebrates violence. We must stop or substantially reduce this and it has to begin immediately."

Online gambling
Trump supports online gambling, based on the following reasoning: "This has to happen because many other countries are doing it and like usual the U.S. is just missing out."

Science and technology
See also Climate change and pollution, above.

A 2016 report in Scientific American graded Trump and three other top presidential candidates—Hillary Clinton, Gary Johnson, and Jill Stein—on science policy, based on their responses to a twenty-question ScienceDebate.org survey. Trump "came in last on all counts" in grading, with scientists and researchers faulting him for a lack of knowledge or appreciation of scientific issues.

Space

As of October 2016, one of Trump's policy advisors declared that, under Trump, NASA would recreate the National Space Council and pursue a goal of "human exploration of the solar system by the end of the century", to drive technology developments to a stronger degree than a manned mission to Mars. Other goals would include shifting budget to deep space exploration from Earth science and climate research, and pursuit of small satellites and hypersonic technology. A possibility of China joining the International Space Station program was also considered. A stronger role of manned Lunar exploration is possible in NASA's quest for a manned mission to Mars. Prior to that statement, the Trump campaign appeared to have little to no space policy at all.

Technology and net neutrality

As of June 2016, Trump has published no tech policy proposals. On the campaign trail, Trump frequently antagonized Silicon Valley figures, using his Twitter account to lambast tech leaders such as Jeff Bezos of Amazon, Tim Cook of Apple, and Brian Chesky of Airbnb over a series of months. He is particularly concerned about the social breakdown of American culture caused by technology, and said, "the Internet and the whole computer age is really a mixed bag," having "complicated lives very greatly."

Trump is opposed to net neutrality, asserting that it is "Obama's attack on the internet" and saying that it "will target the conservative media."

Trump has suggested closing "certain areas" of the Internet. Regarding how this relates to freedom of speech, he added "Somebody will say, 'Oh freedom of speech, freedom of speech.' These are foolish people. We have a lot of foolish people."

The tech publication Recode reports that Trump has made no public statements on the issues of patent reform or broadband access.

The Free Press Action Fund, a group of tech policy activists, rated Trump the worst 2016 presidential candidate for "citizens' digital lives," citing his positions opposing reforming the Patriot Act, favoring Internet censorship, and opposing net neutrality.

Social issues and civil liberties

Abortion 

Trump describes himself as pro-life and generally opposes abortion with some exceptions: rape, incest, and circumstances endangering the health of the mother. As a candidate, he said he believes the issue of abortion "would have been better if it were up to the states." He has said that he was committed to appointing justices who may overturn the ruling in Roe v. Wade.

LGBT rights 

The Trump administration has rolled back many existing LGBT protections and has also introduced new policies that undermine LGBT rights.

Workplace discrimination 

In early 2017, Trump reversed an Obama-era directive that had required companies with large federal contracts to prove their compliance with LGBT protections.

In 2018, Trump signed the United States-Mexico-Canada trade agreement with a footnote exempting the United States from complying with the agreement's call for an end to "sex-based discrimination".

The Trump administration unsuccessfully tried to eliminate nondiscrimination protections at the level of the Supreme Court, where the Justice Department intervened in three employment lawsuits—Bostock v. Clayton County, Georgia; Altitude Express, Inc. v. Zarda; and Harris Funeral Homes v. EEOC—arguing that Title VII of the Civil Rights Act of 1964 does not prohibit job discrimination based on sexual orientation or "transgender status." However, despite the Trump administration's intervention, the Supreme Court ruled on these three cases on June 15, 2020, that sexual orientation and gender identity are indeed covered under existing protections for "sex discrimination."

Healthcare discrimination 
The Affordable Care Act included an Obama-era nondiscrimination provision that explicitly entitled people to receive care regardless of sex or gender identity, but the Trump administration reversed it. On June 12, 2020, the Department of Health and Human Services finalized and revealed its replacement rule. Now, health care providers and insurers may decide whether to serve transgender people.

Transgender rights 

One month after taking office, Trump reversed a directive from the Obama administration that had allowed transgender students to use bathrooms that correspond with their gender identity; this reversal allowed public schools to make their own rules about gendered bathrooms. In 2020, the U.S. Department of Education threatened to withhold funding from Connecticut school districts that allow transgender girls to compete on girls' teams, claiming that the transgender students' participation is a violation of Title IX.

Six months into his presidency, Trump tweeted that transgender individuals would not be allowed to serve "in any capacity" in the U.S. military, an order that took Pentagon officials by surprise. Eventually, in 2019, the Supreme Court—without hearing arguments or explaining its own decision—allowed the Trump administration to move ahead with the ban.

In 2018, the Department of Health and Human Services wrote a memo planning to establish a definition of gender based on sex assignment at birth. The memo argued in favor of a definition of gender "on a biological basis that is clear, grounded in science, objective and administrable" and the government's prerogative to genetically test individuals to determine their sex. If approved by the Justice Department, the definition would apply across federal agencies, notably the departments of Education, Justice, and Labor, which, along with Health and Human Services, are responsible for enforcing Title IX nondiscrimination statutes.

The Trump administration also reversed Obama-era guidance on transgender prisoners, ordering the Bureau of Prisons instead to house them according to their "biological sex."

In 2019, HUD proposed a new rule to weaken the 2012 Equal Access Rule, which requires equal access to housing regardless of sexual orientation or gender identity. This could allow homeless shelters to place transgender women in men's housing or to deny transgender people admission altogether.

In a 2021 speech at the Conservative Political Action Conference in Orlando, Florida, Trump referred to transgender women who are athletes as “biological males."

In April 2021 Donald Trump attacked Arkansas governor Asa Hutchinson for vetoing legislation that would have banned gender-affirming medical care for transgender minors.

Same-sex marriage 

After several decades of national debate, the U.S. Supreme Court legalized same-sex marriage nationwide in 2015 in the Obergefell v. Hodges ruling. After his election, Trump acknowledged that the court had already "settled" the issue. Trump has not, however, been a personal proponent of same-sex marriage, saying as recently as 2011 that he was "not in favor of gay marriage" and saying during his 2016 campaign that he would "strongly consider" appointing Supreme Court justices who were inclined to overturn Obergefell v. Hodges. He had previously supported and been a proponent of civil unions and he included the policy in his 1999-2000 Presidential primary campaign as a Reform Party candidate. During his last year in office, Donald Trump's 2020 presidential campaign launched "Trump Pride," a coalition within the Trump campaign focused on outreach to LGBTQ voters, and claimed that Trump now supports same-sex marriage.

Data collection 
The Trump administration has made efforts to remove questions about LGBT identity and relationships from the 2020 Census, the American Community Survey, the annual National Survey of Older Americans Act Participants (NSOAAP), and the Adoption and Foster Care Analysis and Reporting System.

HIV/AIDS 

In 2017, Trump dissolved the Office of National AIDS Policy and the Presidential Advisory Council on HIV/AIDS, both of which had existed since the 1990s. Every year on World AIDS Day—2017, 2018, 2019—Trump's proclamations have omitted mention of LGBT people.

Religion-based exemptions 
In 2018, the Department of Health and Human Services (HHS) announced the creation of the Conscience and Religious Freedom Division. Its purpose is to enforce federal laws that related to "conscience and religious freedom"; that is, to enable individuals and businesses to exempt themselves from obeying nondiscrimination laws.

In 2019, HHS granted an exemption from an Obama-era nondiscrimination regulation to a foster care agency in South Carolina. HHS cited the Religious Freedom Restoration Act (RFRA) as a basis for allowing federally funded Christian groups to discriminate against non-Christians. Later that year, the Department of Labor, also referencing the RFRA, proposed a new rule to exempt "religious organizations" from obeying employment nondiscrimination law if they invoke "sincerely held religious tenets and beliefs" as their reason to discriminate. In 2020, the Justice Department filed a brief with the Supreme Court in support of another foster care agency in Pennsylvania, defending the agency's right to turn away same-sex couples as part of its “free exercise of religion.”

In 2019, the State Department created the Commission on Unalienable Rights to initiate philosophical discussions of human rights that are grounded in the Catholic concept of "natural law" rather than modern identities based on gender and sexuality. Most of the twelve members of the commission have a history of anti-LGBT comments.

Education 
In March 2022 Trump said he approved of Florida's "Parental Rights in Education" bill, also known as the "don't say gay" bill by its critics during an interview with the Washington Post that occurred after the bill was signed by Florida governor Ron DeSantis, but did elaborate as to why he supports it.

Diplomacy 
The Trump administration eliminated the State Department's position for a Special Envoy for the Human Rights of LGBTI Persons.

In 2018, the Trump administration denied visas to the unmarried same-sex partners of foreign diplomats, even if they were from countries that recognize only civil partnership or that ban same-sex marriage.

Richard Grenell, nominated by Trump as the U.S. Ambassador to Germany, is openly gay. In February 2019, Grenell was announced as the leader of a new campaign to decriminalize homosexuality worldwide, and he hosted a meeting with 11 European activists. Trump seemed unaware of the initiative when he was asked about it the next day. Several months later, Trump tweeted that, "as we celebrate LGBT Pride Month," Americans should "stand in solidarity with the many LGBT people who live in dozens of countries worldwide that punish, imprison, or even execute" people for their sexual orientation. However, that same week, the Trump administration instructed U.S. embassies not to fly the Pride flag during Pride Month.

Judicial appointments 

About one-third of Trump's judicial nominees have anti-LGBT records. The U.S. Senate has, as of May 2020, confirmed nearly 400 of Trump's nominees to their new roles. At least one of the confirmed judges, Patrick Bumatay, is openly gay.

Marijuana 
Marijuana and the rights of individual states to legalize recreational and medical marijuana was an issue of Trump's presidential campaign, and he formally stated during his campaign that he believed states should have the right to manage their own policies with regard to medical and recreational marijuana. Following his election, he reversed his position on recreational marijuana and stated he believed medical marijuana should be allowed but stated the Federal Government may seek legal resolutions for those states which regulate the growth and sale of recreational marijuana. However, in April 2018, he once again reversed himself, endorsing leaving the issue to the states; and in June 2018, Trump backed a bill introduced by Republican Senator Cory Gardner of Colorado and Democratic Senator Elizabeth Warren of Massachusetts that would leave the decision to the states.

See also
 Donald Trump 2016 presidential campaign#Political positions
 Donald Trump on social media
 Presidency of Donald Trump

References

Policies of Donald Trump
Trump, Donald
Trump, Donald
Trump, Donald
Trump, Donald
Trumpism